Chaenothecopsis viridialba is a species of lichen belonging to the family Mycocaliciaceae.

It has a cosmopolitan distribution.

References

Eurotiomycetes
Lichen species
Lichens described in 1871
Taxa named by August von Krempelhuber